The University of California, Washington Center (UCDC) is an student program of the University of California in Washington, DC, located on Scott Circle in Downtown Washington. The center serves as the headquarters of the University of California Office of Federal Governmental Relations and supports UC students interning in the District of Columbia. UC Washington Center is currently led by UC Santa Cruz economist Helen Shapiro.

Program
The University of California, Irvine created the UCDC program in 1982 with four undergraduates. The program soon gained popularity throughout the University of California system, and currently offers two distinct programs. The most competitive program is the UCDC Fall Internship Program, which places students in full-time internship positions from September to December. There is also a program held during the winter/spring semester, which places students in full-time internship positions from January to March or April. Alternatively, the UCDC Academic Year Program hosts students for one quarter/semester between September to June, depending upon which UC campus the undergraduate comes from. This program hosts about 20 or fewer students from each campus, each quarter/semester and pairs full-time internships with a course-load of required lectures, electives, and seminars. This program has several prominent alumni in politics, business, and journalism.

The center also hosts students from guest institutions including: the University of Western Australia, University of Sydney, University of Pennsylvania, the University of Michigan, Carnegie Mellon University, and Washington University in St. Louis.

UCDC also allows for regular guest lectures and a number of social activities. Some of these social activities include visits to various federal institutions, day trips to regional attractions, and in-house activities sponsored by the student-run Resident Advisory Council. Additionally, students may freely tour Washington, D.C., and travel across the Eastern Seaboard during the weekends is a popular option.

Facilities
UCDC is housed in the UC Washington Center, an 11-story complex located on Scott Circle across from The Beacon Hotel. It is not far from the Washington Metro stations (specifically Dupont Circle, Farragut West, and Farragut North).  At five blocks directly north of the White House, nearby neighborhoods include: Georgetown, Dupont Circle, and Adam's Morgan.

The Center offers mostly-furnished suite accommodations for undergraduates, graduate students, staff, and faculty. The Center also hosts a fitness center, mail room, computer lab, study rooms, lecture halls, recreational room, patio, and a lobby.

The Center also hosts the office of the UC Office of Federal Governmental Relations, which represents the University of California at the federal level. The UC Washington Center is also involved in an educational and mentoring partnership with the nearby Ross Elementary School.

External links
UC Washington Center

Washington Center
University of California, Washington Center
Universities and colleges in Washington, D.C.
Internship programs